Bryndís Valsdóttir (born 23 January 1964) is an Icelandic philosopher and former footballer who was a member of Iceland's national team from 1992 to 1994.

Early life
Bryndís was born in Reykjavík on 23 January 1964.

Football career
She played the majority of her career with Valur, winning her first national championship in 1978. She played for Giugliano in the Italian Serie A from 1985 to 1986.

Following her playing career, she became the manager of Grótta.

Titles
Icelandic Championships: 4
1978, 1986, 1988, 1989
Cup Champions: 5
1984, 1986, 1987, 1988, 1990

References

External links
 

1964 births
Living people
Bryndis Valsdottir
Bryndis Valsdottir
Bryndis Valsdottir
Bryndis Valsdottir
Women's association football forwards